The Premio Carlo Chiesa is a Listed flat horse race in Italy open to thoroughbred fillies and mares aged three years or older. It is run over a distance of 1,200 metres (about 6 furlongs) at Capannelle in April.

History
The event is named after Carlo Chiesa, the owner of the Allevamenti National breeding organisation in the 1970s.

The race was formerly classed at Listed level, and it used to be staged in May. For a period it was a 1,600-metre event restricted to fillies aged four or older.

The Premio Carlo Chiesa was given Group 3 status in 2004. It was cut to 1,200 metres and opened to three-year-olds in 2007. It was relegated to Listed status from the 2015 running. The event is currently held in mid-April.

Records
Most successful horse since 1987 (2 wins):
 Bemont Park – 1995, 1996
 Miss Carolina – 1997, 1998

Leading jockey since 1987 (5 wins):
 Maurizio Pasquale – L'Ereditiera (1993), Miss Carolina (1997), Cromac (1999), Morena Park (2001), Torrigiana (2002)

Leading trainer since 1987 (3 wins):
 Luigi Camici – L'Ereditiera (1993), Miss Carolina (1997, 1998)
 Lorenzo Brogi – Cromac (1999), Torrigiana (2002), Kykuit (2006)

Winners since 1987

See also
 List of Italian flat horse races

References

 Racing Post / www.labronica.it:
 1997, 1998, 1999, 2000, 2001, 2002, 2003, 

 capannelleippodromo.it – Albo d'Oro – Premio Carlo Chiesa.
 galopp-sieger.de – Premio Carlo Chiesa.
 horseracingintfed.com – International Federation of Horseracing Authorities – Premio Carlo Chiesa (2013).
 pedigreequery.com – Premio Carlo Chiesa – Roma Capannelle.

Sprint category horse races for fillies and mares
Sports competitions in Rome
Horse races in Italy